Environmental issues in Korea may refer to:
 Air pollution in South Korea
 Climate change in South Korea
 Environment of Korea
 Environment of North Korea
 Environment of South Korea
 Pollution in Korea